Heady Lane Cemetery is a family cemetery from the early 19th century located in Fishers, Indiana. It is reportedly haunted.

History 

The cemetery dates back to the early 19th century and has headstones for many members of the Heady family in it. According to a legend surrounding Heady Lane Cemetery there are spirits along the Hollow at 126th Street in Fishers at Allisonville Road.

Conner Prairie keeps the legend alive every Halloween by telling of how a ghost of a tormented grave-robber traded in cadavers, until one night he dug up his own son's body, haunts the woods that line the roadway.

Another version on the Heady Hollow Legend describes a fire that burned down a schoolhouse and killed several children run by the Heady family in the late 19th century.

The legend goes that the ghosts of children come out on foggy nights not far from Heady Lane Cemetery at Heady Hollow, in Fishers where Allisonville Road intersects at 126th Street a very dark and wooded area prone to fog.

An article explaining the legend of Heady Hallow by Georgianne Neal appeared in the Noblesville Ledger, June 4, 1979.

An 1866 map of Delaware Township shows Delaware Township School No. 2. located on the northeast corner of 126th & Allisonville Road. This is the school attributed to the legend. No further information about the fire has been found thus far.

See also 
 Conner Prairie

References

External links 
Heady Hollow proofparanormal article
Heady Hollow on Ghosthounds
Hamilton County Historical Society
1866 Surveyors Map of Delaware Township Showing The School
 

Cemeteries in Indiana
Protected areas of Hamilton County, Indiana
19th-century establishments in Indiana
Reportedly haunted locations in Indiana